Acamptodaphne eridmata is a species of sea snail, a marine gastropod mollusk in the family Raphitomidae.

Description

Distribution
This species occurs in the Pacific Ocean off the Solomon Islands.

References

 Morassi, M. & Bonfitto, A. (2010) New raphitomine gastropods (Gastropoda: Conidae: Raphitominae) from the South-West Pacific. Zootaxa, 2526:54-68

eridmata
Gastropods described in 2010